The Colla, Qolla or Qulla Kingdom was established in the northwestern basin of the Titicaca, one of the Aymara kingdoms that occupied part of the Collao plateau after the fall of Tiwanaku. In the mid-15th century the Collas possessed a vast territory, one of the largest of the Aymara kingdoms, which at the time the 9th Sapan Inka Pachakutiq Yupanqui Qhapaq the Intipchurin ("son of the sun"),  conquered along with other political entities in the region.

The Inca empire named the Qullasuyo or Colla Region towards a larger region than the original Colla Kingdom, as the Aymara kingdoms with strong cultural ties between them were called by the Incas with the collective term of "Colla" as it was for them the most significant of them all.

Organization 
The Qulla were organized into two regions (Quechua and Aymara: Suyu): Urcosuyu (Urco: male, fire) and Umasuyu (Uma: female, water).

Their capital was Hatunqulla, i.e. "Colla, the Great" located 34 km north of Puno in the Urcusuyu and was ruled by the dynasty of the Zapanas. The capital of the Umasuyu was Azangaro, which depended on Hatunqulla. This form of government based on duality was characteristic of the central Andean societies, in which both parts were complementary but one still ruled over the other, the Inca for example divided their empire and society in Hanan (Quechua: Upper) and Hurin (Quechua: Lower).

The Urcosuyu had the towns of Hatuncolla, Caracoto, Juliaca, Nicasio, Lampa, Cabana, Cabanilla, Mañazo, Ullagachi, Paucarcolla, Capachica and Coata.

The Umasuyu had the towns of Azangaro, Asillo, Arapa, Ayaviri, Saman, Taraco, Caquijana, Chupa, Achaya, Caminaca, Carabuco, Cancara, Moho, Conima, Ancoraimes, Huaycho, Huancasi, Huancané, Achacachi, and Copacabana.

In addition the Qollas of Umasuyu also had in their territory the Titicaca Island, Bernabe Cobo said: "Titikaka Island ...was formerly populated with Indian Qollas, the same nation of Copacabana natives". Alonso Ramos Gavilan noted: "the Qollas of Titikaka had that famous altar and shrine, was a waka from the puquina qollas and uroqollas".

Within the realm of the Qulla were three ethnic groups: Aymara, Puquina and Uro (some Uros spoke Puquina and the others Uruquilla). Felipe Guaman Poma de Ayala clearly distinguish these ethnic groups and identified them as Qolla to the Aymaras, as Puquina Qolla to the Puquinas and as Uro Qolla to the Uros.

Inca Conquest 
About ten years after his coronation, Pachacuti began his expansionist military campaign to the Collao, sending a group of soldiers under the command of Apo Conde Mayta towards the border with the Colla Kingdom, the powerful group that had as lord Chuchi Capac, also known as the Qulla Capac. It didn't take long for Pachacuti to join the vanguard troops, entering in enemy lands until reaching the base of the Vilcanota.

The Qulla Capac, aware of the Inca incursion into his territory, went with his army to the town of Ayaviri to wait for them. Upon arriving at this town, Pachacuti understood that a peaceful subjection wouldn't be possible, so a long battle ensued. As the fight was prolonged, fearing to be defeated, the Collas retreated to Pucara, an andean fortification, where they were persecuted by the Incas. In Pucara the second battle was fought, in which not only were the Incas  victorious, but they also managed to take prisoner the powerful Qulla Capac. Once ensured the victory, Pachacútec went to Hatunqulla, home of the defeated curaca, where he remained until all the subordinate towns came to render obedience.

See also 
 Qullaw
 Qullasuyu
 Sillustani
 Puno Region
 Aymara people
 Uru people
 Qulla people
 Lupaca nation

References 

Andean civilizations
Archaeological cultures of South America
Archaeology of Peru
Archaeology of Bolivia